Mohammed Abu-Nimer is an American expert on conflict resolution and dialogue for peace.  He is a full professor at the American University School of International Service in International Peace and Conflict Resolution in Washington, DC, the largest school of international relations in the United States.

Overview

Professor Mohammed Abu-Nimer an expert on conflict resolution, and dialogue for peace. As a professor with over 20 years of teaching experience, he has developed numerous courses that deal with different facets of peacebuilding and conflict resolution and regularly publish on the subject. While his research has focused on a wide array of areas in peacebuilding and conflict resolution, his most recent areas of focus have included faith-based peacebuilding, interfaith dialogue in peacebuilding and building social cohesion, and pedagogical considerations on incorporating peace and forgiveness education in the Arab world. Currently, Prof. Abu-Nimer is employed as a full professor at the American University School of International Service in International Peace and Conflict Resolution in Washington, DC, the largest school of International Relations in the United States, and is also the action Senior Advisor to the young KAICIID Dialogue Centre, an international organization that specialized in interreligious and intercultural dialogue.

Education

Professor Abu-Nimer completed his doctoral dissertation, Conflict Resolution between Arabs and Jews in Israel: A Study of Six Intervention Models, in 1993 at George Mason University. Since receiving his Ph.D. Professor Abu-Nimer received a two-year fellowship from the United States Foundation for Education in 1989, followed by a two-year graduate fellowship in 1990 at George Mason University. Prof. Abu-Nimer has been awarded a number of fellowships (e.g. Visiting Research Fellow at the Harry Truman Institute for the Advancement of Peace (1999-2000), Visiting Fellow at the Joan B. Kroc Institute at Notre Dame University (2002-2003), Senior Peace Fellow in the Evaluation of Peacebuilding Program in a Development Context at the United States Institute of Peace (USIP) (2007-2008)) as well as numerous grants (Annual Kenan Grant for Faculty Development from Guilford College (1995-1997), Peacebuilding and Islam from USIP (2001), Sam Richardson grant for Evaluation of Madrassa in Pakistan (2007-2008)) and awards (Teaching Excellence Award, American Political Science Association (2003), Morton Deutsch Award from the Society for the Study of Peace, Conflict and Violence (2005), Distinguished Alumni Award from the Institute for Conflict Analysis and Resolution, George Mason University (2009).

Professional history

Dr. Abu-Nimer is the Director of the Peacebuilding and Development Institute and the Director of the Conflict Resolution Skills Institutes at American University, both of which offer unique and peacebuilding courses for professionals in the field.  Dr. Abu-Nimer is also the Founder and Director of the Salam: Peacebuilding and Justice Institute in Washington, DC, which collaborates with conflict resolution practitioners, religious leaders, and academics to bridge the differences between Muslim and non-Muslim communities and encourage peacebuilding. He is the co-founder and co-editor of the prestigious Journal of Peacebuilding and Development, an interdisciplinary journal that focuses on.

As a professor and practitioner Dr. Abu-Nimer specializes in conflict resolution and dialogue for peace among Palestinians and Jews in Israel, the Israeli-Palestinian conflict, the application of conflict resolution models in Muslim communities, interreligious conflict resolution training, interfaith dialogue, and the evaluation of conflict resolution programs.

Dr. Abu-Nimer has intervened and led conflict resolution training workshops in many conflict areas around the world, including: Palestine, Israel, Egypt, Northern Ireland, the Philippines (Mindanao), Sri Lanka, and the United States. He also has extensive experience in evaluating peace processes, including evaluations done on Seeds of Peace, the Neve Shalom/Wahat Al Salam school in Jerusalem, a World Vision development program in Mindanao, Madrasah Teachers Training for ICRD.

Dr. Abu-Nimer serves on the boards of numerous organizations, including the Editorial Board of International Journal of Transitional Justice, the Governing Board of World Dialogue, and Abraham’s Vision. He has also led international delegation to Iran, Palestine, and Saudi Arabia, as well as chairing numerous international conferences on the Islamic framework and practice of peace, dialogue, justice, and development.

Publications

Prof. Abu-Nimer has been both author and an editor of more than 13 books on faith-based and interfaith peace-building (e.g. Nonviolence and Peacebuilding in Islamic Context: Bridging Ideals and Reality (2003); Peace-Building By, Between and Beyond Muslims and Evangelical Christians (2009)), as well as interfaith dialogue and its role in peacebuilding and reconciliation (e.g. Unity in Diversity: Interfaith Dialogue in the Middle East (2007); Dialogue Conflict Resolution and Change: Arab-Jewish Encounters in Israel (1999)). 

Abu-Nimer's newest volume, Faith-Based Peacebuilding: Challenges of Practice, jointly edited with Michele Garred was scheduled for release in 2017.

In addition , Abu-Nimer has been author to numerous articles in refereed journals, such as the International Review of Education, the Journal of International and Comparative Education, Journal of Religious Ethics, Peace and Change: A Journal of Peace Research and the International Journal of Politics, Culture and Society'.

He has contributed chapters to a number of edited books.  His articles and chapters have covered themes of forgiveness and peace education in Muslim societies  such as “Forgiveness in the Arab and Islamic Contexts; Between Theology and Practice” in Journal of Religious Ethics (2013), “Examining Attitudes and Beliefs about Forgiveness Among Teachers in the Arab World” in Peace and Change: Journal of Peace Research (2016), “Integrating Education for Peace and Diversity in Islamic Schools in Niger; Negotiating Possibilities and Challenges” in the International Review of Education (2017); religion and peacebuilding such as "Culture, Religion, and Politics in International Mediation" in The Handbook of Mediation: Theory, Research and Practice (2017), “Religion and Peacebuilding: Reflections on Current Challenges and Future Prospects” in Journal of Inter-Religious Studies (2015); non-violence such as “Islamic Principles of Nonviolent and Peace Building: A Framework,” in Conflict, Identity, and Reform in the Muslim World: Challenges for U.S. Engagement (2009), “Religious Contribution to Dialogue and Nonviolent Action in the Israeli-Palestinian Conflict: Possibilities and Obstacles.” Palestinian Society and History Review (2007), “Nonviolent Action in Israel and Palestine: A Growing Force.” In Bridging the Divide: Peacebuilding in Israeli-Palestinian Conflict 2006; and an array of other topics related to conflict resolution, dialogue, and peacebuilding.

References

External links
 http://www.american.edu/sis/faculty/facultybiographies/abunimer.htm
 http://www.aupeace.org/faculty/abu-nimer
 http://www.salaminstitute.org/
 https://www.kaiciid.org/news-events/media/mohammed-abu-nimer

Living people
American University faculty and staff
Year of birth missing (living people)